Geovibrio ferrireducens is a Gram-negative,  Fe(III)-reducing, obligately anaerobic and motile bacterium from the genus of Geovibrio.

References

Further reading 
 
 
 

Deferribacterota
Bacteria described in 2000